Yannick Haury (born 12 June 1954) is a French politician representing the Democratic Movement. He was elected to the French National Assembly on 18 June 2017, representing the 9th constituency of the department of Loire-Atlantique.

Haury is a certified pharmacist and ran a pharmacy in Saint-Brevin-les-Pins with his wife for 30 years.

References

1954 births
Living people
Deputies of the 15th National Assembly of the French Fifth Republic
Democratic Movement (France) politicians
Deputies of the 16th National Assembly of the French Fifth Republic
Members of Parliament for Loire-Atlantique